Eunice Olumide MBE is a Scottish fashion model and actress.

Early life
Born in Edinburgh, Scotland, Olumide has dual British and Nigerian nationality. The name "Olumide" means "God has come" or "My Hero has come" in the Yoruba language.

At Glasgow Caledonian University she graduated in Communication and Mass Media with a first-class Bachelor of Arts. Aged 21, she took a postgraduate degree in Film Studies at Queen Mary University of London and an MA in Metaphysics, after getting a scholarship to study at the University of Pennsylvania.

Modelling career
At 15, Olumide was spotted shopping in Sauchiehall Street, Glasgow, and later scouted by Select models while visiting family in London. At the time she knew nothing about the fashion industry. She took a break from modelling to go to university. Over the years she has been signed with Premier, KOKO, Nemesis, Mega, La Agenica, VIVA, AMQ, Ford and IMM Düsseldorf.

She has done fashion weeks and shoots in Japan, Paris, Milan, Barcelona, Poland, Germany, UAE, USA, Africa and the UK.

Olumide appeared in Dazed & Confused, Dry, London Fashion Week Daily, Dansk, Tank, I.D., Grazia, Luire Magazine Japan, Harpers Bazaar, Hunger, Oyster, Papercut, New York, Bahrain Confidential, WAD Magazine, Retro, InStyle, Fabulous, Italian Vogue and British Vogue.
She has worked with Zandra Rhodes, Myleen Klass, Gio Pomodoro, Caryn Franklin, NKWO, JJ Noki, and designers including Swarovski, Christopher Kane, Jil Sander, Adidas, Evisu, Kswiss, Henry Holland, Jacob Kimmie, Prada, Georgina Harding, Gucci, Jean Paul Gaultier, Tom Ford, Alexander Wang and Jacob Birge. Olumide has modelled for Top Shop, Mulberry, Tommy Hilfiger, Ugg, Lee Jeans, Toms, The Body Shop, Alexander Wang, Vivienne Westwood, Bunmi Koko, New Look and Harris Tweed.  She is also as an ambassador for Fashion Targets, Adopt an Intern, FAD and worked with Climate Revolution.  
In 2018, Olumide's book How To Get Into Fashion, focusing on exploitation in the industry and the impact of Fast fashion was published followed by a promotional appearance at the Edinburgh International Book Festival, interviewed by Elizabeth Payton at The New York Times. As an equal rights campaigner she deliver a speech at the Houses of Commons and contributed to Equity's policy and etiquette to protect models in the work place.

Fashion design 
Her debut spring summer collection was inspired by her Afro-Scottish background and ancestry, a balance of European and British style tailoring and traditionally African fabric and patterns. In 2016, she collaborated with Puma, Top Shop and Evisu on selected pieces, and produced her own accessories collection in 2017, consisting of spring summer and autumn winter sunglasses for men and women.  In 2018, some of this was included in a temporary exhibition at National Museum of Scotland.

In 2019, Olumide produced an On-Schedule show for the British Fashion Council at London Fashion Week.  NGRGFW included question and answer sessions featuring Dennis Calpone, Afuah Hirsch, Emma Dabiri and Nish Kumar as well as a fashion show, commissioned by Lambeth Council at Lambeth Town Hall. Olumide used the event to draw attention to the plight of the Windrush Generation illegally deported from the United Kingdom in 2018, after a mistake by the then Prime Minister Theresa May and Amber Rudd.

Music career
Olumide is also a DJ touring with Grace Jones, Damian Marley and Nas.  Venues include The Apollo, Lovebox Festival, The Great Escapes Festival, The Groucho Club, Soho House, Glastonbury and Websterhall NYC with Matt Sorum.

Olumide also played with acts including  Skepta, Wiley, Roots Manuva, The Game, Common, Busta Rymes, Wu-Tang, OT Genesis and Jay Z. Between April and June, she toured the United States with The Roots and Mos Def in Orlando, Miami, New York, Philadelphia and Atlanta, and at the Bonnaroo Music Festival, a four-day event in Tennessee in June.  She also supported Police Academy's Michael Winslow in the U.S. and UK.

In 2018, Olumide was involved in a charity Christmas song called "Rock With Rudolph", written and produced by Grahame and Jack Corbyn. Recorded by 26 personalities in aid of Great Ormond Street Hospital and released digitally on Saga Entertainment on 30 November 2018 under the artist name The Celebs. The song reached number two on the iTunes pop chart.

In 2020, amid the COVID-19 pandemic in the United Kingdom, Olumide returned to join The Celebs which now included Frank Bruno and X Factor winner Sam Bailey to raise money for both Alzheimer's Society and Action for Children. They recorded a new rendition of "Merry Christmas Everyone" by Shakin' Stevens and it was released digitally on 11 December 2020, on independent record label Saga Entertainment. The music video debuted exclusively on Good Morning Britain the day before release. The song peaked at number two on the iTunes pop chart.

In 2021, Olumide re-joined The Celebs to record a cover of The Beatles classic "Let It Be", in support of the Mind charity, released on 3rd December 2021. Olumide was part of a choir of celebrities including Georgia Hirst, Anne Hegerty and Ivan Kaye, who were backing EastEnders actress Shona McGarty.

Acting career
Olumide was the second Assistant Director and played a role in BAFTA award winning project called Trouble Sleeping.  In 2017 she played Rosie in After Louise  Olumide appeared in the short film, One Sweet Oblivios Antidote', with Lenny Henry'. Since then she has appeared in Star Wars Rogue One, The Last Jedi and Absolutely Fabulous.  In 2019, she landed a role in Noughts and Crosses alongside rapper Stormzy, produced by Shawn Corey Carter also known as Jay Z at Roc Nation USA.

Olumide produced and directed a show Metamorph through Open Art Surgery at the Traverse Theatre and founded the brief existence of The Official Youth on the Fringe at the Edinburgh Festival Fringe, and starred in The Chicken Trial at the Pleasance courtyard. In 2017, she produced and directed A Work in Progress live at The Stand Comedy club. Stephen K Amos, Katheryn Ryan, Trevor Noah and Dane Baptiste also appeared.

Television and broadcasting career
Olumide has worked on BBC, Channel 5, ITV and Sky television. She has presented from the 2012 BAFTA Awards  and at Cannes Film Festival. 
Olumide appears regularly on BBC Radio and in 2020 on BBC Radio 4 Pick of The Week, and is a panellist on prime time talk shows as well as John Bishop's Britain and BBC Learning Zone. She produced an exclusive interview for Vice on Reincarnated starring Snoop Dogg (also known as Snoop Lion).  Olumide has interviewed comedians Doc Brown and Stephen K Amos.

In 2018, she appeared on BBC Loop, the Victoria Derbyshire Show, Secrets of The Royal Wardrobe Question Time, Lorraine, Good Morning Britain and BBC One's "Scotland's Treasures". In 2019, she interviewed Adrian Lester and Josie Rourke at the premier of the film  Mary Queen of Scots for MOBO  She also participated as a panelist at the premier of The Hate You Give with George The Poet

She presented her own episode of BBC Radio Scotland's late night music show Music Match. In 2019, she presented The Sista Collective on BBC Radio 5 Live interviewing Director Amma Asante and Singer Jamelia

Other activities
Olumide produced a variety of youth groups across the UK in Brixton London and at Hillhead High School, Granton and Muirhouse's G-Code in Edinburgh.

She is an ambassador for Zero Waste Scotland, for issues of conservation and sustainability, as well as for Fashion Targets, joining the ranks of Kate Moss, Edith Bowman, Twiggy, Alan Carr & Sharon and Kelly  Osborne.  She regularly fund raises for charities including Children's Hospice Association Scotland,  The Well Foundation, Love Music Hate Racism and is a global ambassador for Graduate Fashion Week. Olumide is a patron for Best Beginnings, and Adopt an Intern, helping to get women who have had a career break back into work.

In 2015, Olumide founded her own art gallery representing artists including Richard Wilson, Tim Nobel, and Nick Walker.  In 2019, she became the first Scottish model to produce an on-schedule London Fashion Week show Next Generation Regeneration to raise awareness on the Windrush scandal. She also delivered a key note speech at the Houses of Parliament which chimed with an investigation on the impact of the textile industry on the environment. She participated in an initiative with union Equity to develop a framework and strategy to support fashion models in the UK. She also set up   Enigmatic Production and Promotion, through the Prince's Business Youth Trust,.

Awards and nominations
Olumide was nominated for the Model of the Year in the Scottish Fashion Awards, sponsored by Vogue in 2011, 2013, 2015.  She won Model of the Year in 2018 at the BBE Awards. In 2017, she was featured alongside supermodels Stella Tennant, Winnie Harlow and Brenda Finn. She appeared on the Front Cover of The Evening Standard with supermodel Adwoa Aboah.

In November 2017, Olumide was awarded Member of the Order of the British Empire (MBE) in the 2017 Birthday Honours for services to broadcasting, the arts, and charity. The investitute ceremony was held at Buckingham Palace, with Prince Charles handing the award to Olumide as well as to other award recipients at that event.  

In 2018, she was named as a Design Champion by V&A Dundee highlighting established names in design related industries in Scotland.

See also
Black British
British Nigerian

References

External links

 eunice olumide. Fashions Finest. 6 June 2011
Olowu, Yemi. Model Watch! All eyes on her – Eunice Olumide speaks on conquering Scotland. YNaija. 14 September 2011
Interview: model and fashion designer Eunice Olumide. The Daily Buzz. 29 February 2012
Young, Caroline. Meet the Model: Eunice Olumide. Herald Scotland. 28 March 2013

Living people
Scottish Muslims
Scottish people of Nigerian descent
Scottish people of Yoruba descent
Converts to Islam
Scottish female models
Yoruba female models
Scottish fashion designers
Black British fashion people
British hip hop singers
Scottish women rappers
Black British women rappers
Scottish DJs
Black British DJs
Yoruba actresses
Yoruba fashion designers
Actresses from Edinburgh
Alumni of Glasgow Caledonian University
Alumni of Queen Mary University of London
University of Pennsylvania alumni
Members of the Order of the British Empire
Year of birth missing (living people)
British women fashion designers